Ronald S. Marsico (born October 30, 1947) is a former Republican member of the Pennsylvania House of Representatives for the 105th District and was elected in 1988. He was the Republican Chairman of the House Judiciary Committee and a member of the House Transportation Committee.

Personal
Marsico graduated from Bishop McDevitt High School and the Ohio State University. He and his wife have two children and seven grandchildren. He previously served in the United States Army Reserve from 1967 to 1973.

References

External links
Representative Marsico's official web site
Pennsylvania House profile

1947 births
Living people
Republican Party members of the Pennsylvania House of Representatives
Politicians from Harrisburg, Pennsylvania
Ohio State University alumni
21st-century American politicians